Robert Grayson is New York-born comedian based in Australia.

Under the name Silverpram, in October 1995 he released a parody EP titled Frogstamp, a parody of Silverchair's 1995 debut album Frogstomp, which included a song based on Silverchair's "Tomorrow" titled "(I Turn Four) Tomorrow". The song was nominated for the 1996 ARIA Award for Best Comedy Release and reached No. 72 on the ARIA singles chart. The song was called "a heap of crap" by The Sydney Morning Heralds Emma Tom.

Discography

Extended plays

Awards and nominations

ARIA Music Awards
The ARIA Music Awards are a set of annual ceremonies presented by Australian Recording Industry Association (ARIA), which recognise excellence, innovation, and achievement across all genres of the music of Australia. They commenced in 1987. 

! 
|-
| rowspan="2"| 1996 || Frogstamp || ARIA Award for Best Comedy Release ||  || 
|-

References

American male comedians
Living people
Year of birth missing (living people)
Place of birth missing (living people)